Arnold Petersen (April 16, 1885 – February 5, 1976) was the National Secretary of the Socialist Labor Party of America from 1914 to 1969. Petersen played a major role as spokesman for that party and as a promoter of the De Leonist version of Marxist theory in the 20th century.

Biography
Arnold Petersen was born in Odense, Denmark, the son of a tailor. After graduating college, he immigrated to the United States and worked in a paper box factory. In 1907, he joined the Socialist Labor Party.

Daniel De Leon nominated Petersen to be national secretary a few months before his death in May 1914. As national secretary, Petersen restructured the party and saved it from bankruptcy. He was also a prolific author, writing over fifty books, including a series of biographical monographs on De Leon, collected as Daniel De Leon: Social Architect.

When he retired as Socialist Labor Party of America leader in 1969, he had been the organizations leader for fifty five of the organization's ninety-four years of existence, and seventy-nine years as a "De Leonist" organization (which the party dates from 1890).

A longtime resident of Teaneck, New Jersey, he died on February 5, 1976, in Paterson, New Jersey.

Selected works
Unemployment and overproduction (1930)
The virus of anarchy: Bakuninism vs. Marxism (1932)
Manifesto on War. Decay and corruption of international capitalism (1937)
Constitution of the United States : Founding of the Bourgeois Republic New York : New York Labor News Company, 1937
Daniel De Leon: From Reform to Revolution 1886–1936 New York: New York Labor News Co., 1937
De Leon the uncompromising New York: New York Labor News Co., 1939
Daniel De Leon: social architect (1941)
From reform to bayonets (1941)
Inflation of Prices or Deflation of Labor? (1942)
Karl Marx and Marxian science (1943)
Daniel de Leon: Internationalist New York: New York Labor News Co., 1944
Daniel De Leon: Social scientist (1945)
Marxism vs. Soviet despotism (1959)
Socialism and human nature (1962)
Bourgeois Socialism: Its Rise and Collapse in America (1963)

References

Sources
 Biographical Dictionary of the American Left (Bernard K. Johnpoll and Harvey Klehr editors ( "Arnold Petersen" by John Gerber, pp. 314–5. Westport, CN: Greenwood Press. 1986

Other sources
Girard, Frank and Ben Perry, Socialist Labor Party, 1876–1991: A Short History (Philadelphia, PA: Livra Books, 1991)
 Hass, Eric The Socialist Labor Party and the Internationals (New York Labor News Co. 1949)
Quint, Howard The Forging of American Socialism: Origins of the Modern Movement: The Impact of Socialism on American Thought and Action, 1886–1901 (Columbia, SC: University of South Carolina Press, 1953)

External links
 	Arnold Petersen	Selected quotes

People from Odense
1885 births
1976 deaths
American socialists
Danish emigrants to the United States
Members of the Socialist Labor Party of America
People from Teaneck, New Jersey